Winfield is an Australian brand of cigarettes, currently owned by multinational company British American Tobacco. Cigarettes are manufactured by British American Tobacco Australia (BATA), its local subsidiary.

History
Winfield was launched in 1972 and entered the Australian market in the common pack size of the 20s. They were the first brand in Australia to launch a pack size of 25's and used this to convey their image of being good value to the everyday Australian.  Typical advertisements at the time noted that Winfield was "5 smokes ahead of the rest". Winfield remains available in Australia today in packs of 20, 25, 30, or 40 cigarettes.

In 2004, British American Tobacco Australia shipped 853 billion Winfield cigarettes 2004, which made it the second largest tobacco company and Winfield the largest brand in Australia before Altria and Longbeach. Both BATA and Philip Morris had a 40% market share in the Australian cigarette market.

In 2006, a new product extension was made available in the Australian market, with a number of varieties being released in a charcoal filter. The packaging for these products varies from the traditional products with a predominantly brushed-silver package and colored lettering indicating the strength (Blue, Gold, Sky Blue or White).

Advertising and promotions
The slogan "...anyhow, have a Winfield 25's" is still easily recalled today, even after cigarette advertising has long been banned in Australia.

Today, the 'anyhow' slogan is very rare, except for appearing in some limited marketing materials.

Other slogans found on an Australian Winfield packet prior to the introduction of plain packaging laws include "Australia's own since 1972" which is located on the silver foil insert, and "The Genuine Australian" on the top of the lid.  Also, if looked closely at the emblem of Winfield the motto "Force no friend, fear no foe" can be seen on older packets. If an old Winfield packet is turned upside down the word "PLAY" can be seen clearly. Since the introduction of plain packaging, none of these mottos or slogans have been visible on cigarette packaging, although a short time after the introduction of plain packaging, the motto "anyhow have a Winfield" could be seen in the inner lid of the packets.

Sport sponsorship
Winfield was a major sponsor of sport in Australia until outlawed by the Tobacco Advertising Prohibition Act 1992 that banned all tobacco advertising and sponsorship starting from December 1995 onwards. Some limited exemptions were granted for the Australian Grand Prix and the Australian Open Golf, hence Winfield was seen at the Australian Grand Prix in 1998 and 1999 when it was the title sponsor of the Williams F1 Team.

Auto sponsorship

Winfield was the main sponsor of the Williams F1 Team in 1998 and 1999. The sponsorship was part of the deal Williams signed with the then-parent company of Winfield, Rothmans International, whose flagship brand had sponsored the multi-time world championship team since 1994. Among the drivers who ran under the Winfield colors for Williams were former world champion Jacques Villeneuve and former IndyCar Series champion Alex Zanardi. The arrangement came to an end following the 1999 season as British American Tobacco had purchased Rothmans International, and since they were already owners of their own Formula 1 operation, they chose instead to focus their sponsorship on their own team.

From 1992 until 1995, Winfield was the title sponsor of the Australian motor racing team Gibson Motorsport. Highlights included Mark Skaife winning two Australian Touring Car Championships in 1992 and 1994, as well as the Australian Drivers' Championship in 1992 and 1993. Skaife and Jim Richards also won the 1992 Bathurst 1000. 

The banning of tobacco sponsorship before the 1996 season has been laid down as a significant contributor to Gibson Motorsports demise since its glory days of the early 1990s with the team folding during the 2003 season, despite a Bathurst win in 1999, never achieving the same level of results.

From the 1970s until 1995, Winfield sponsored a number of high-profile teams in Speedway and Drag racing.

Motor sponsorship
Winfield also sponsored the Honda Team in the Australian Superbike Championship from 1986 until 1995. Malcolm Campbell won the 1986, 1989 and 1990 editions in the Winfield-sponsored Honda VFR750F and Honda VFR750R bikes. and later Troy Corser and Anthony Gobert would also win the 1994 and 1995 editions with their Honda RC30 and Honda RC45 bikes. After the Tobacco Advertising Prohibition Act 1992 was passed, Winfield no longer sponsored the team.

Winfield also sponsored the regular Superbike World Championship in 1994 and 1995, as well as the annual Winfield Triple Challenge at Eastern Creek each January between 1992 and 1995.

Other sponsorship
From 1982 until 1995, it was the title sponsor of the New South Wales Rugby League premiership with the winner of the grand final receiving the Winfield Cup. It also sponsored both test and club/franchise international rugby union in South Africa from 1995 until 1999 when tobacco advertising was prohibited there.

Controversy

Fake cigarettes containing more tobacco
In 2011, it was reported that various fake Winfield cigarettes were smuggled into Australia and sold onto the black market.

Independent tests were carried out on a pack of Winfield Blues from both a real version and an illegal copy made in Asia and smuggled into Australia to be sold on the black market. The real Winfield Blues weighed 0.58g, whereas the fakes weighed 0.66g. The real ones lost 87 percent of their weight when smoked, while the fakes lost only 84 percent. The tests - performed by chemist firm Sharp and Howells and commissioned by The Daily Telegraph - appear to discredit claims that fake cigarettes are significantly different or more dangerous than the real product. "The fake Winfield Blues come up higher." Sharp and Howells laboratory manager John Franceschini said. "The genuine Winfield Blues and the fake Intershop ones were quite similar."

A spokesman for British American Tobacco Australia, the maker of Winfield, said the tests were not exhaustive enough to determine true quality, although he acknowledged there was no such thing as a safe cigarette. "At the end of the day, smoking is harmful regardless of whether it's legal or illegal." the BATA spokesman said. "The issue with illegal tobacco is that 100 percent of the profits go to the pockets of criminals while 70 percent of the legal product sale goes to taxpayers through tobacco excise and tax."

Markets
Winfield is mainly popular in Australia and New Zealand, but also was or still is sold in Papua New Guinea, Singapore, Malaysia, Canada, Luxembourg, Belgium, the Netherlands, Germany, France, Austria, Italy and South Africa.

Winfield products
The table below is a summary of the complete Winfield product line in Australia. Whilst different descriptors may be used, the red and blue varieties are typically always available in all markets where Winfield is sold. Furthermore, in some markets, Winfield appears in a standard pack size of 30 or 20, whereas 25 is the standard in Australia. Winfield is available in packs of 20, 25, and 30 in Australia.

Notes
 (No longer available since 2008)

Tar content is shown after the product name. In response to action by the Australian Competition & Consumer Commission (ACCC) in 2005, the major tobacco companies have agreed to remove the terms 'light' and 'mild' from their packaging.

Also, BATA is the only manufacturer to have clear "use by" date codes on their packets, unlike ITA and PMI, which use codes only known in the industry.

See also

 Tobacco smoking

Notes

References

Australian brands
British American Tobacco brands
Tobacco companies of Australia